Tanz im August ("Dance in August") is an annual festival for contemporary dance in Berlin. It was founded by Nele Hertling in West Berlin in 1988, and is now presented by the Hebbel am Ufer (HAU) theatre company on various stages in Berlin. It presents companies from all over the world with their new choreography, aesthetics and formats, new projects by Berlin artists, collaboration with international guests, and co-production for world premieres and German premieres. Virve Sutinen has been artistic director from 2014.

History 

Tanz im August was founded as an international festival for contemporary dance by Nele Hertling in 1988, then in West Berlin. The festival developed to an annual festival of several weeks around August. It brings notable companies from all over the world together in Berlin, with new choreography, aesthetics and formats. The festival also presents new projects by Berlin artists, collaboration with international guests and the co-production of world premieres and German premieres.

The festival is now presented by the Hebbel am Ufer (HAU) theatre company.

Tanz im August is funded by the Capital Cultural Fund. Since 2014, Virve Sutinen from Sweden has been the artistic director.

Productions 
Numerous formats are fixed components of the festival program. The 31st edition in 2019 featured 70 performances of 31 productions at eleven different venues with 160 artists from 15 countries. The 2020 edition took place in a modified form due to the COVID-19 pandemic. Instead of a stage program, an extended online program was offered.

Tanz im August has been publishing a Magazin im August since 2014.

Artistic direction 
 1989–2003: Nele Hertling
 2003–2007: Ulrike Becker, Matthias Lilienthal, Bettina Masuch, André Thériault
 2007–2008: Ulrike Becker, Matthias Lilienthal, Marion Ziemann, Bettina Masuch, André Thériault
 2009–2013: Ulrike Becker, Pirkko Husemann, Matthias Lilienthal, André Thériault, Marion Ziemann
 2013: Bettina Masuch
 Since 2014: Virve Sutinen

Artists 
Artists and companies featured at Tanz im August have included Dominique Bagouet, Tanztheater Wuppertal Pina Bausch, Jérôme Bel, Bruno Beltrão / Grupo de Rua, Rosemary Butcher, Roberto Castello, Nora Chipaumire, Michael Clark Company, Cloud Gate Dance Theatre, Martha Graham Dance Company, Trajal Harrell, Deborah Hay, Anne Teresa De Keersmaeker, María La Ribot, Faustin Linyekula, Constanza Macras' Dorky Park, Lemi Ponifasio, Eszter Salamon, Wayne McGregor, Meg Stuart and Sasha Waltz.

Retrospectives 
Since 2015, Tanz im August has shown a retrospective of an important living artist every other year, resulting in a publication on their life and work.

 2015 – Rosemary Butcher
 2017 – La Ribot
 2019 – Deborah Hay

30th anniversary 
In 2018, Tanz im August celebrated its 30th anniversary. In addition to the festival events, journalist Claudia Henne compiled the festival's production history in an archive, which is available in the Tanz im August Online Magazin.

References

Further reading

External links 
 

Contemporary dance
Dance festivals in Germany
Theatre festivals in Berlin